Cheboygan may refer to a location in the United States:

Cheboygan, Michigan, the city
Cheboygan County, Michigan
Cheboygan River
Cheboygan Point in Lake Huron near the city of Cheboygan
Cheboygan State Park near the city of Cheboygan

See also
Sheboygan (disambiguation)